Muhammad Hassan may refer to:

Muhammad Hassan (Brunei) (reign 1582–1598 or 1601-1610), ninth Sultan of Brunei
Muhammad Hassan (Taliban), an alleged leader in the Taliban's Quetta Shura
Muhammad Hassan (wrestler) (born 1981), American professional wrestler born Marc Copani
Muhammmad Nurridzuan Abu Hassan (born 1992), Malaysian footballer

See also
Mohamad Hasan (politician) (born 1956), Malaysian politician
Mohamed H.A. Hassan (born 1947), Sudanese scientist
Mohammad Hasan (disambiguation)
Mohammed Hassan (disambiguation)